Lombrum Naval Base, also known as HMPNGS Tarangau and formerly PNG Defence Force Base Lombrum, is a naval military base operated by the Maritime Operations Element of the Papua New Guinea Defence Force (PNGDF). It is located on Manus Island in Papua New Guinea. Lombrum is the home port of the PNGDF's Pacific-class patrol boat force.

After redevelopment in 1950 by the Royal Australian Navy, it was known as HMAS Seeadler, being renamed HMAS Tarangau soon afterwards.

The Manus Regional Processing Centre was established within the base in 2001.

History

The naval facility, Manus Naval Base, was first built during World War II as a "Lion" which was code for a major Fleet installation of the United States Navy.  It was constructed by the Seabees of CBs 11, 58, and 71 and commissioned in January 1944. The base and Seeadler Harbor became a major US Naval Advance Base during the latter part of the war.  The base was a major ship repair depot. At the base was the Large auxiliary floating drydock USS ABSD-4 and ASDB-2, able to repair the largest capital ships. There were camps on Manus Island and Los Negros Island. The facility was abandoned by the Americans in 1946 with the downsizing of their military and their policy of containment shifted strategic focus away from the southern Pacific. 

The Australian government took over the site, redeveloped it, and reopened it as the Royal Australian Navy (RAN) base HMAS Seeadler, commissioning on 1 January 1950 to replace the RAN base at Dreger Harbour, near Finschhafen. The base was renamed HMAS Tarangau, the name of the former Dreger Harbour base, on 1 April 1950.

The base was used as a refueling and stores point for RAN ships traveling between Australia and South East Asia. The size of the facility gradually shrank through the 1950s and 1960s, and the decision was made to hand the facility over to Papua New Guinea as part of the process leading to the nation's independence from Australia. As part of this, Tarangau was paid off on 14 November 1974 and given to the Papua New Guinea Defence Force, who reactivated the base as PNG Defence Force Base Lombrum.

In 2018 Australian and Papua New Guinea officials met to discuss expanding the base again, so that it can also serve as a base for Australian and United States Navy vessels.

Gallery

See also

List of former Royal Australian Navy bases

References

Further reading

Military of Papua New Guinea
Manus Province
Royal Australian Navy
Seabees